Chichali may refer to:
 Chichali Ahmad, Ben Moala Rural District, Khuzestan Province, Iran
 Chichali Gholamreza, Howmeh Rural District, Khuzestan Province, Iran
 Chichali (archaeological site), an archaeological site in India